Take Command is a series of real-time tactics video games by American studio MadMinute Games. The series consist of two games, Take Command: Bull Run (2004) and Take Command - 2nd Manassas (2006). The games are real-time wargames depicting some of the major battles of the American Civil War. The developers describe the games as "real-time combat simulators". The first game was released under the Activision Value brand, which is Activision's budget line. The second game is released through Paradox, a Swedish publisher that specializes in strategy games. A third game, based on the Battle of Shiloh, was said to be in development according to the instruction manual for 2nd Manassas, but has likely been discontinued.

References

Take Command: 2nd Review on GameRankings
GameSpot Review

External links
 MadMinute Games homepage
 Forum for Horse and Musket mod
 The New Harpers Ferry Arsenal Modding Site

2004 video games
2006 video games
American Civil War video games
Real-time tactics video games
Video game franchises
Video games developed in the United States
Video games set in the United States
Windows games
Windows-only games